The 2007 Premier League Asia Trophy (Traditional chinese: 巴克萊亞洲錦標賽) was the third edition of the Premier League Asia Trophy, a four-team association football tournament held every two years. The tournament was held in Hong Kong. The 2007 edition was competed by South China AA, the winner of Hong Kong's FA Cup, Liverpool, Portsmouth and Fulham at the 40,000-capacity Hong Kong Stadium. The semi-finals took place on 24 July and the final and third-place play-off were on 27 July 2007.

Portsmouth won the first semi-final 1–0 against Fulham after a goal by Benjani in the 45th minute. Liverpool beat South China in the second semi-final thanks to a John Arne Riise free-kick and a Xabi Alonso penalty. South China pulled a goal back with a Li Haiqiang free-kick, but Daniel Agger scored to make it 3–1. Fulham beat South China 4–1 in the third place play-off, while Portsmouth beat Liverpool 4–2 on penalties to win the Premier League Asia Trophy after a goalless draw in normal time.

Competition format
The competition used a knock-out format. South China played Liverpool, while Fulham played Portsmouth, both matches taking place on 24 July. The winners competed in the final on 27 July, while the losers played in the third place play-off on the same day.

Prizes
Hong Kong FA Cup winner South China received HK$500,000 from the organizers as appearance fee in the tournament. The winner of the tournament received a trophy as well as £100,000 prize money.

Official match programme

An A5 sized, 60-page bilingual (English/Chinese) official match programme was published for sale during the match days within the stadium. It retailed at HK$20 (~£1.30).

Results

Semi-finals

Third place play-off

Final

Goalscorers
The goal scorers from the Premier League Asia Trophy 2007 are as follows:

Player of the Tournament
The Player of the Tournament award was awarded to David James of Portsmouth. James kept 2 clean sheets, and saved penalties from Yossi Benayoun and Fernando Torres.

Gallery

See also
Hong Kong FA Cup 2006-07

External links
 Barclays and Premier League head east
 Premiership trio set for Hong Kong Trophy

2007

Prem

2007
Asia

fi:Premier League Asia Trophy